Carlos Gaete Moggia (born 4 November 1987 in Stockholm) is a Swedish football midfielder of Chilean descent who plays for IFK Haninge in the Swedish Ettan Norra.

Career
Moggia began his career in the youth side for Haninge FF and joined in Spring 2005 to Hammarby Talang FF. After one season left Hammarby and joined on loan to Haningealliansen FF in the early of 2006.

He made his debut for Hammarby's first team on 14 July 2008 in an away win against Malmö, a match in which he scored with a volley.

He played another three seasons in the club, not being a regular in any season, before joining third-tier club IK Sirius in August 2011.

He spent the first half of the 2017 season with the Norwegian side Elverum Fotball.

References

External links
 
 
 

1987 births
Living people
Swedish footballers
Hammarby Talang FF players
Hammarby Fotboll players
Swedish people of Chilean descent
Sportspeople of Chilean descent
IK Sirius Fotboll players
IFK Värnamo players
AFC Eskilstuna players
Västerås SK Fotboll players
Allsvenskan players
Superettan players
Swedish expatriate footballers
Expatriate footballers in Norway
Swedish expatriate sportspeople in Norway
Association football midfielders
Footballers from Stockholm